The 2015–16 Polish Cup was the sixty-second season of the annual Polish football knockout tournament. It began on 18 July 2015 with the first matches of the preliminary round and ended on 2 May 2016 with the final at the National Stadium in Warsaw. Winners of the competition qualified for the qualifying tournament of the 2016–17 UEFA Europa League.

The 2015–16 season brought several changes into the competition format determined by the 2014 reform of II liga (3rd tier), which decreased the number of teams playing in the league from 36 to 18 and the number of teams participating in the Polish Cup from 86 to 68. The tournament had one preliminary round (instead of two in previous seasons), in which also the 6 lowest-ranked I liga (2nd tier) teams entered.

Legia Warsaw successfully defended the Polish Cup champion title, winning the final game 1–0 against Lech Poznań and secured their eighteenth title.

Participating teams

Source: 90minut.pl
Notes
  Competed in 2014–15 season as Energetyk ROW Rybnik.
  Widzew Łódź dissolved after the 2014–15 season.
  Flota Świnoujście dissolved after the 2014–15 season.
  Limanovia withdrew from the competition, citing financial difficulties.

Round and draw dates 

Source: 90minut.pl

Preliminary round 
The draw for this round was conducted at the headquarters of the Polish FA on 17 June 2015. Participating in this round were 16 regional cup winners, 18 teams from the 2014–15 II Liga and 6 lowest ranked teams from the 2014–15 I Liga. The matches were played on 18, 19 and 22 July 2015.

16 of the 24 I Liga and II Liga teams participating in the preliminary round were drawn against the 16 regional cup winners, and the remaining 8 were drawn against each other. Games were hosted by teams playing in the lower division in the 2015–16 season. The host of Znicz Pruszków vs. Nadwiślan Góra (both playing in II Liga) game was determined by the order in which the teams were drawn.

! colspan="3" style="background:cornsilk;"|18 July 2015

|-
! colspan="3" style="background:cornsilk;"|19 July 2015

|-
! colspan="3" style="background:cornsilk;"|22 July 2015

|-
! colspan="3" style="background:cornsilk;"|No match
|-

|}
Notes
Note 1: Flota Świnoujście dissolved after the 2014–2015 season and withdrew from the Polish Cup. The successor club plays in the Szczecin I group of the A klasa (8th tier) 
Note 2: Widzew Łódź dissolved after the 2014–2015 season and withdrew from the Polish Cup. The successor club plays in the Łódź Voivodeship IV Liga (5th tier)
Note 3: Limanovia withdrew from the competition, citing financial difficulties.

First round 
The draw for this round was conducted at the headquarters of the Polish FA on 17 June 2015. The matches were played on 25, 26, 28 and 29 July 2015. Participating in this round were the 20 winners from the previous round and 12 highest ranked teams from the 2014–15 I Liga.

The 12 teams joining in this round were seeded and their opponents were drawn from the 20 winners of the preliminary round (the other 8 formed the remaining 4 matches). Games will be hosted by teams playing in the lower division in the 2015–16 season. Hosts of matches between teams playing in the same tier were decided by a draw conducted on 20 July 2015, with the exception of the Katowice derby, where both teams agreed to play on GKS's Stadion Miejski.

! colspan="3" style="background:cornsilk;"|25 July 2015

|-
! colspan="3" style="background:cornsilk;"|26 July 2015

|-
! colspan="3" style="background:cornsilk;"|28 July 2015

|-
! colspan="3" style="background:cornsilk;"|29 July 2015

|}

Bracket

Round of 32 
The draw for this round was conducted at the PGE Narodowy on 23 July 2015. The matches were played on 11, 12 and 13 August 2015. Participating in this round are the 16 winners from the previous round and 16 teams from the 2014–15 Ekstraklasa.

! colspan="3" style="background:cornsilk;"|11 August 2015

|-
! colspan="3" style="background:cornsilk;"|12 August 2015

|-
! colspan="3" style="background:cornsilk;"|13 August 2015

|}

Round of 16 
Competing in this round were the 16 winners from the previous round. The draw for this round was conducted at the National Stadium, Warsaw on 23 July 2015. Matches were played on 15, 16, 22–24 September 2015. Hosts of matches between teams playing in the same tier were decided by a draw conducted on 14 August 2015.

! colspan="3" style="background:cornsilk;"|15 September 2015

|-
! colspan="3" style="background:cornsilk;"|16 September 2015

|-
! colspan="3" style="background:cornsilk;"|22 September 2015

|-
! colspan="3" style="background:cornsilk;"|23 September 2015

|-
! colspan="3" style="background:cornsilk;"|24 September 2015

|}

Quarter-finals
The 8 winners from Round of 16 competed in this round. The matches were played in two legs. The first leg took place on the 27 and 28 October 2015. The second leg took place on 18–19 November and 16 December 2015. The draw for this round was conducted at the National Stadium, Warsaw on 23 July 2015. Host of first match between teams playing in the same tier were decided by a draw conducted on 28 September 2015.

|}

First leg

Second leg

Semi-finals
The 4 winners from Quarterfinals will compete in this round. The matches will be played in two legs. The first leg took place on 15–16 March 2016. The second leg took place on 5–6 April 2016. The draw for this round was conducted at Stadion Miejski, Wrocław on 16 December 2015.

|}

First leg

Second leg

Final
The final match was played at the National Stadium, Warsaw on 2 May 2016.

Top goalscorers

Notes

References

See also
 2015–16 Ekstraklasa
 2015–16 I Liga

Polish Cup
Cup
Polish Cup seasons